The Prospect Park Water Tower, sometimes referred to as the Witch's Hat Water Tower, is a historic water tower in the Prospect Park neighborhood of Minneapolis, Minnesota, United States.  It was built in 1913 on Tower Hill Park, a hilltop park established in 1906.  The water tower has become the neighborhood's architectural mascot for its singular design by Frederick William Cappelen.  The tower is rumored to be the inspiration for Bob Dylan's song "All Along the Watchtower," as the tower was clearly visible from Dylan's home in nearby Dinkytown.

The park and water tower were listed on the National Register of Historic Places in 1997 for having local significance in the themes of architecture, community planning and development, and engineering.  It was nominated for its associations with city planning, urban infrastructure, architectural eclecticism, and the work of architect Frederick William Cappelen.  In 2015 they were also listed as contributing properties to the Prospect Park Residential Historic District.

History
Erected in 1913 on Tower Hill, one of the highest points in Minneapolis, the tower was built to increase water pressure in the area and thereby enhance firefighting efforts. The functional structure, however, was given a whimsical appearance by city engineer Frederick William Cappelen. To the delight of generations of Minnesotans to come, he topped the building with a fanciful brimmed "hat" of green ceramic tile, and hence its nickname was born.

Tower Hill and the Prospect Park neighborhood have enjoyed a love affair of sorts over the years. From the beginning, the tower and surrounding parkland attracted neighbors, young and old, who picnicked under shade trees in summer and sledded down the hill's icy slopes in winter. The tower's observation deck provided views of the Minneapolis and St. Paul skylines, and the building itself inspired many artists who captured its one-of-a-kind profile in charcoal and watercolor.  More than once over the years it has also galvanized neighborhood pride and determination on its own behalf.

The Prospect Park Water Tower ceased to function as a water tower in 1952, but it remained an esteemed neighborhood symbol. In 1955 when the city announced plans to demolish the tower following a lightning strike, the community mobilized. "Spurred on by eleven members of the Prospect Park Blue Birds (a junior organization of the Campfire Girls)," neighbors fought city hall and saved their tower.

Since the late 20th century, the observation deck is open only one day a year, which is celebrated with an ice-cream social.

Gallery

See also
 National Register of Historic Places listings in Hennepin County, Minnesota

References

External links

 The Prospect Park Water Tower

1913 establishments in Minnesota
Buildings and structures in Minneapolis
Individually listed contributing properties to historic districts on the National Register in Minnesota
National Register of Historic Places in Minneapolis
Towers completed in 1913
Water towers in Minnesota
Water towers on the National Register of Historic Places in Minnesota